George Fisher (August 10, 1891 – August 13, 1960) was an American film actor of the silent era. He appeared in more than 70 films between 1911 and 1929. His role in the 1916 Thomas H. Ince film Civilization is noteworthy as the first cinematic depiction of Jesus.

Partial filmography

 The Battle of Gettysburg (1913)
 Rumpelstiltskin (1915) - Captain Pilkin
 The Darkening Trail (1915) - Jack Sturgess
 Civilization (1916) - The Christ
 The Three Musketeers (1916) - King Louis XIII
 Home (1916) - Allan Shelby
 Honor Thy Name (1916) - Jack Deering
 Shell 43 (1916) - Lieutenant Franz Hollen
 The Thoroughbred (1916) - Reverend Thomas Hayden
 Somewhere in France (1916) - Herr Vogel
 Three of Many (1916) - Paul Cardoza
 The Wax Model (1917) - John Ramsey
 The Promise (1917)  - St. Ledger
 The Gentle Intruder (1917) - Arnold Baxter
 The Spirit of Romance (1917) - Percival Rollins
 Environment (1917) - Henry Pennfield
 Annie-for-Spite (1917) - Willard Kaine Nottingham
 Periwinkle (1917) - Richard Langdon Evans
 Pride and the Man (1917) - Warren Leonard
 The Rainbow Girl (1917) - Richard Warner
 The Sea Master (1917) - Hugh
 Alimony (1917) - Howard Turner
Within the Cup (1918) - Le Saint Hammond
 Blue Blood (1918) - Dr. John Rand
 A Little Sister of Everybody (1918) - Hugh Travers Jr
Maid o' the Storm (1918) - Franklin Shirley
 Fires of Youth (1918) - Ronald Standish
 Mrs. Leffingwell's Boots (1918) - Walter Huntley
 And a Still Small Voice (1918) - Richard Dunlap
 Luck and Pluck (1919) - Karl Richter
 Hearts Asleep (1919) - Randolph Lee
 Gates of Brass (1919) - Dick Wilbur
 Rose o' the River (1919) - Claude Merrill
 The Prince of Avenue A (1920) - Regie Vanderlip
 The Yellow Typhoon (1920) - M. Andre duval
 The Woman in His House (1920) - Robert Livingston
 The Devil to Pay (1920) - Larry Keeling
 The Heart of a Woman (1920) - Bob Brown
 The Land of Jazz (1920) - Captain De Dortain
 Bare Knuckles (1921) - Haines
 Colorado Pluck (1921) - Philip Meredith
 Beach of Dreams (1921) - Maurice Chenet
 Hearts of Youth (1921) - Herman Brudenell
Moonlight Follies (1921) - Rene Smythe
 Sure Fire (1921) - Burt Rawlings
 A Parisian Scandal (1921) - Emile Carret
 Domestic Relations (1922) - Pierre
 Trail of the Axe (1922) - Jim Malkern
 Don't Shoot (1922) - Archie Craig
 Divorce (1923) - Winthrop Avery
 Excitement (1924) - Chester Robbins
 The Bowery Bishop (1924) - Philip Foster
 Justice of the Far North (1925) - Dr. Wells
After Marriage (1925) - David Morgan
 Typhoon Love (1926) - Unknown role
 For the Term of His Natural Life (1927) - Rufus Dawe / John Rex
 Black Hills (1929) -  Jack Merritt

References

External links

1891 births
1960 deaths
American male film actors
American male silent film actors
20th-century American male actors
Male actors from Michigan